James Zangari (March 30, 1929 – February 15, 2011) was an American politician who served in the New Jersey General Assembly from the 28th Legislative District from 1980 to 1996.

Boran and raised in Newark, Zangari served in Japan with the United States Army during the Korean War. He won his first political office in 1977, when he won a seat on the Essex County Board of Chosen Freeholders.

He died of cancer on February 15, 2011, in Newark, New Jersey at age 81.

References

1929 births
2011 deaths
County commissioners in New Jersey
Democratic Party members of the New Jersey General Assembly
Deaths from cancer in New Jersey
Politicians from Newark, New Jersey
United States Army soldiers